was the pen name of , a Japanese novelist. Imaoka also used the pen name  to write criticism and music. She was known for her record-breaking 130-volume Guin Saga series, which has been translated into English, German, French, Italian and Russian. Her style has been described as being part of the New Wave science fiction movement. Outside of her literary endeavors, she was a playwright, composer, and pianist who performed with her own jazz ensemble, the Azusa Nakajima Trio.

Biography
Kurimoto was born in Tokyo and studied literature at Waseda University, graduating in 1975. Still in her twenties, she won the Gunzo Prize for New Writers (Criticism), as Azusa Nakajima, in 1977, and the Edogawa Rampo Prize in 1978 for "Our Era". This spectacular introduction to the literary world drew a lot of attention, especially as she was the youngest ever winner of the Edogawa Rampo Prize. Her use of two pen names was also discussed, and shortly after she won the Rampo prize, Heibon Panchi magazine featured a conversation between the "two" writers.

Kurimoto is known for having written nearly 400 books since she began her career. She wrote in several genres, including science fiction, fantasy, horror, mystery, yaoi and Japanese-style historical romance.

Her writing shows the influence of Mori Mari, with a number of her works featuring homosexual love, and her 1979 novel, Mayonaka no Tenshi (真夜中の天使; Midnight Angel) played an important part in the creation of the shonen-ai/yaoi genres, "pioneering interest" in them before they became widely popular. She has also supported yaoi in her work as Nakajima. She was also heavily involved with the first issue of the yaoi magazine June in 1978, contributing stories and criticism as Kaoru Kurimoto and Azusa Nakajima, as well as using a number of other pseudonyms.

She died on May 26, 2009, aged 56, in a Tokyo hospital, from pancreatic cancer, which was diagnosed in 2007.  She had been writing the 130th volume of the Guin Saga up until May 23, 2009.  Kurimoto was given a special award posthumously by the Science Fiction and Fantasy Writers of Japan association.

Works

As Azusa Nakajima
The outlines of literature 文学の輪郭 Bungaku no rinkaku - won the Gunzo Prize for New Writers with this work in 1977.
Nakajima, Azusa. 1987. Bishōnen Nyūgakumon. Tōkyō: Shūeisha
Nakajima, Azusa. 2005. Tanatosu no kodomo tachi – Kajōtekiō no seitaigaku. Tōkyō: Chikuma
Shobō.

As Kaoru Kurimoto
Bokura no Jidai ぼくらの時代 "Our Era" - her debut novel, in 1978.
Mayonaka no Tenshi 真夜中の天使 "Midnight Angel", 1979, a novel with "shonen-ai mono" themes.
Guin Saga, 1979 to 2009 (her death) - a "heroic fantasy" epic about a warrior cursed with a leopard head mask.
Makai Sui Koten 魔界水滸伝 - regarded as an important work in the Japanese Cthulhu Mythos, tells the story of a war between the Elder Gods and Japanese gods. It is a retelling of The Water Margin, a Chinese classical novel.
Makyou Yuugeki Tai - a work bridging the Guin Saga and the Cthulhu Mythos, with a male protagonist named after the author.
The Sword of Paros, a 1986 manga illustrated by Yumiko Igarashi.

References

Vertical Guin Saga Roundtable

External links
 (in Japanese)

1953 births
2009 deaths
Deaths from cancer in Japan
Deaths from pancreatic cancer
Japanese literary critics
20th-century Japanese novelists
21st-century Japanese novelists
Japanese mystery writers
Japanese science fiction writers
Japanese fantasy writers
Japanese speculative fiction critics
Edogawa Rampo Prize winners
People from Tokyo
Waseda University alumni
Women science fiction and fantasy writers
Women mystery writers
Japanese women novelists
Japanese women literary critics
20th-century Japanese women writers
21st-century Japanese women writers
20th-century pseudonymous writers
Pseudonymous women writers